The Nuclear Command Authority (NCA) of India is the authority responsible for command, control and operational decisions regarding India's nuclear weapons programme. It comprises a Political Council headed by the Prime Minister of India and an Executive Council headed by the National Security Advisor.

Introduction 

India's first Nuclear test was conducted on 18 May 1974 with the code name Smiling Buddha. Since then India has conducted another series of tests at the Pokhran test range in the state of Rajasthan in 1998, which included a thermonuclear test, code named Operation Shakti. India has an extensive civil and military nuclear program, which includes at least 10 nuclear reactors, uranium mining and milling sites, heavy water production facilities, a uranium enrichment plant, fuel fabrication facilities, and extensive nuclear research capabilities.

Though India has not made any official statements about the size of its nuclear arsenal, different country estimates indicate that India has anywhere between 150 and 300 nuclear weapons. 

On 4 January 2003, the Cabinet Committee on Security (CCS) constituted the Political Council and the Executive Council of the NCA. The Executive Council gives its opinion to the Political Council, which authorises a nuclear attack when deemed necessary. While the Executive Council is chaired by the National Security Advisor (NSA), the Political Council is chaired by the Prime Minister. This mechanism was implemented to ensure that Indian nukes remain firmly in civilian control and that there exists a sophisticated Command and Control (C2) mechanism to prevent their accidental or unauthorised use.

Strategic Forces Command

The directives of the NCA are to be operationalised by the Strategic Forces Command under the control of a Commander-in-Chief of the rank of either
of the three tri-service high ranks in charge of the management and administration of the tactical and strategic nuclear forces.

The NCA may be seen as the first stage in the development of an effective and robust Command and Control (C2) and Indications-and-Warning (I&W) systems and infrastructure for its strategic nuclear forces.

Delivery of weapons 

The current status of delivery systems for Indian nuclear weapons is unclear and highly classified. India has developed and tested nuclear weapons that could be delivered on the Prithvi and Agni missiles, although its extent and operational preparedness in this respect remains unclear.

India first tested the 150 km range Prithvi-1 in 1988, and the 250 km range Prithvi-2 in 1996, and the Prithvi missiles were inducted into the Indian armed forces by the early to mid 1990s.  India was slow to develop the Agni missiles. It first tested the Agni technology demonstrator in 1989, the two-stage 2000 km range Agni-2 in 1999, single-stage 700 km range Agni-1 in 2001, the 3,000 km range three-stage Agni-3 in 2006, Agni-4 with a range of 4,000 km in 2011 and Agni-5 with a estimated range between 5,000 and 8,000 in the year 2012. The successor, Agni-6 is said to be under development with an speculated range of 10,000 km.

Since India had a few nuclear weapons prior to the availability of these missiles, especially the Agni, it is probable that the current Indian nuclear weapons inventory includes weapons designed for delivery using airplanes. The Indian Armed Forces operates the Dassault Rafale which is capable of carrying out nuclear attacks. There are no open-source reports suggesting which if any of these planes have been equipped to deliver air-dropped atomic weapons. One or more of the following aircraft types might be used for this purpose. The MiG-27 and the Jaguar were originally designed to perform ground attack missions, and would require only modest modification to deliver nuclear weapons. The Indian Air Force also operates several other older and less capable types of ground-attack aircraft which would seem rather less likely candidates for delivering nuclear weapons. The MiG-29, Sukhoi Su-30 MKI and Mirage 2000 were originally designed to perform air-to-air combat missions, though they could potentially be modified to deliver air-dropped nuclear weapons. Plans are also on for the delivery of nuclear weapons via the Arihant class submarine using the SLBM/SLCM Sagarika.

New Delhi-Islamabad nuclear hotline

India and Pakistan set up their own nuclear hotline on Sunday, 20 June 2004.

See also 
 Integrated entities 
 Defence Planning Committee, tri-services command at policy level with NSA as its chief
 Defence Cyber Agency, tri-services command
 Integrated Defence Staff, tri-services command at strategic level composed of MoD, MEA and tri-services staff
 Armed Forces Special Operations Division, tri-services command at operational level
 Defence Space Agency, draws staff from all 3 services of Indian Armed Forces
 Strategic Forces Command, nuclear command of India
 Indian Nuclear Command Authority, Strategic Forces Command
 Special Forces of India, tri-services, RAW and internal Security each has own units
 Andaman and Nicobar Command, first operational tri-services command

 Assets
 Indian military satellites
 List of Indian Air Force stations
 List of Indian Navy bases
 List of active Indian Navy ships
 India's overseas military bases
 
 Other nations
 Special Operations Forces Command (KSSO) - Russian equivalent command
 Joint Special Operations Command (JSOC) - U.S. equivalent command

 General concepts
 Joint warfare, general concept
 Minimum Credible Deterrence
 List of cyber warfare forces of other nations

References 

Military of India
Nuclear weapons programme of India
Vajpayee administration
2003 in India
Nuclear command and control
Government agencies established in 2003